In computer science, the Cocke–Younger–Kasami algorithm (alternatively called CYK, or CKY) is a parsing algorithm for context-free grammars published by Itiroo Sakai in 1961. The algorithm is named after some of its rediscoverers: John Cocke, Daniel Younger, Tadao Kasami, and Jacob T. Schwartz. It employs  bottom-up parsing and dynamic programming.

The standard version of CYK operates only on context-free grammars given in Chomsky normal form (CNF). However any context-free grammar may be algorithmically transformed into a CNF grammar expressing the same language .

The importance of the CYK algorithm stems from its high efficiency in certain situations. This makes it one of the most efficient parsing algorithms in terms of worst-case asymptotic complexity, although other algorithms exist with better average running time in many practical scenarios.

Standard form

The dynamic programming algorithm requires the context-free grammar to be rendered into Chomsky normal form (CNF), because it tests for possibilities to split the current sequence into two smaller sequences.

Algorithm

As pseudocode
The algorithm in pseudocode is as follows:

 let the input be a string I consisting of n characters: a1 ... an.
 let the grammar contain r nonterminal symbols R1 ... Rr, with start symbol R1.
 let P[n,n,r] be an array of booleans. Initialize all elements of P to false.
 let back[n,n,r] be an array of lists of backpointing triples. Initialize all elements of back to the empty list.
 
 for each s = 1 to n
     for each unit production Rv → as
         set P[1,s,v] = true
 
 for each l = 2 to n -- Length of span
     for each s = 1 to n-l+1 -- Start of span
         for each p = 1 to l-1 -- Partition of span
             for each production Ra    → Rb Rc
                 if P[p,s,b] and P[l-p,s+p,c] then
                     set P[l,s,a] = true, 
                     append <p,b,c> to back[l,s,a]
 
 if P[n,1,1] is true then
     I is member of language
     return back -- by retracing the steps through back, one can easily construct all possible parse trees of the string.
 else
     return "not a member of language"

 Probabilistic CYK (for finding the most probable parse) 
Allows to recover the most probable parse given the probabilities of all productions.
 let the input be a string I consisting of n characters: a1 ... an.
 let the grammar contain r nonterminal symbols R1 ... Rr, with start symbol R1.
 let P[n,n,r] be an array of real numbers. Initialize all elements of P to zero.
 let back[n,n,r] be an array of backpointing triples.
 for each s = 1 to n
   for each unit production Rv →as
     set P[1,s,v] = Pr(Rv →as)
 for each l = 2 to n -- Length of span
   for each s = 1 to n-l+1 -- Start of span
     for each p = 1 to l-1 -- Partition of span       
       for each production Ra → Rb Rc
         prob_splitting = Pr(Ra →Rb Rc) * P[p,s,b] * P[l-p,s+p,c]
         if prob_splitting > P[l,s,a] then 
           set P[l,s,a] = prob_splitting
           set back[l,s,a] = <p,b,c>
 
 if P[n,1,1] > 0 then
     find the parse tree by retracing through back
     return the parse tree
 else
     return "not a member of language"

As prose
In informal terms, this algorithm considers every possible substring of the input string and sets  to be true if the substring of length  starting from  can be generated from the nonterminal . Once it has considered substrings of length 1, it goes on to substrings of length 2, and so on. For substrings of length 2 and greater, it considers every possible partition of the substring into two parts, and checks to see if there is some production  such that  matches the first part and  matches the second part. If so, it records  as matching the whole substring. Once this process is completed, the input string is generated by the grammar if the substring containing the entire input string is matched by the start symbol.

Example

This is an example grammar:

Now the sentence she eats a fish with a fork is analyzed using the CYK algorithm.

For readability, the CYK table for P is represented here as a 2-dimensional matrix M containing a set of non-terminal symbols, such that  is in  if, and only if, .

Extensions

Generating a parse tree
The above algorithm is a recognizer that will only determine if a sentence is in the language. It is simple to extend it into a parser that also constructs a parse tree, by storing parse tree nodes as elements of the array, instead of the boolean 1. The node is linked to the array elements that were used to produce it, so as to build the tree structure. Only one such node in each array element is needed if only one parse tree is to be produced. However, if all parse trees of an ambiguous sentence  are to be kept, it is necessary to store in the array element a list of all the ways the corresponding node can be obtained in the parsing process. This is sometimes done with a second table B[n,n,r] of so-called backpointers.
The end result is then a shared-forest of possible parse trees, where common trees parts are factored between the various parses.

Parsing non-CNF context-free grammars

The size of a grammar is the sum of the sizes of its production rules, where the size of a rule is one plus the length of its right-hand side. For the use in teaching, Lange and Leiß propose a slight generalization of the CYK algorithm, "without compromising efficiency of the algorithm, clarity of its presentation, or simplicity of proofs" .

Parsing weighted context-free grammars
It is also possible to extend the CYK algorithm to parse strings using weighted and stochastic context-free grammars. Weights (probabilities) are then stored in the table P instead of booleans, so P[i,j,A] will contain the minimum weight (maximum probability) that the substring from i to j can be derived from A. Further extensions of the algorithm allow all parses of a string to be enumerated from lowest to highest weight (highest to lowest probability).

Numerical stability 
When the probabilistic CYK algorithm is applied to a long string, the splitting probability can become very small due to multiplying many probabilities together. This can be dealt with by summing log-probability instead of multiplying probabilities.

Valiant's algorithm
His algorithm computes the same parsing table
as the CYK algorithm; yet he showed that algorithms for efficient multiplication of matrices with 0-1-entries can be utilized for performing this computation.

However, the constant term hidden by the Big O Notation is so large that the Coppersmith–Winograd algorithm is only worthwhile for matrices that are too large to handle on present-day computers , and this approach requires subtraction and so is only suitable for recognition. The dependence on efficient matrix multiplication cannot be avoided altogether:  has proved that any parser for context-free grammars working in time  can be effectively converted into an algorithm computing the product of -matrices with 0-1-entries in time , and this was extended by Abboud et al. to apply to a constant-size grammar.

See also
 GLR parser
 Earley parser
 Packrat parser
 Inside–outside algorithm

References

Sources

External links
 CYK parsing demo in JavaScript
 Exorciser is a Java application to generate exercises in the CYK algorithm as well as Finite State Machines, Markov algorithms etc

Parsing algorithms